Li Bin is the name of the following Chinese people:

Li Bin (Ming dynasty) (died 1422), Ming dynasty general
Li Bin (politician) (born 1954), politician
Li Bin (diplomat) (born 1956), diplomat
William Li or Li Bin (born 1974), founder of electric car company NIO
Li Bin (water polo) (born 1983), water polo player
Li Bin (footballer) (born 1991), footballer
Li Bin (physicist), scientist